KKDM (107.5 MHz) is a commercial FM radio station in Des Moines, Iowa. The station airs a Top 40 (CHR) radio format and is owned by iHeartMedia, Inc.  KKDM uses the KISS-FM branding used by many iHeart CHR/Top 40 stations.  It carries the syndicated Elvis Duran and the Morning Show from co-owned Premiere Networks.

KKDM's studios and offices are located on Grand Avenue in Des Moines.  Its transmitter is at S. 57th Avenue W. and West 124th Street S., near Colfax.  KKDM broadcasts in the HD Radio format.  Its HD-2 subchannel carries a hip hop format known as "The Heat."  The HD-3 subchannel carries the K-Love Christian Contemporary music format from the Educational Media Foundation which is also heard on translator station 95.3 K237GC.

History

KKDM was established by local businessman Rich Eychaner as Midwest Radio, Inc. KKDM signed on the air for the first time, on October 1, 1995.  Eychanner sold Midwest Radio Inc to Clear Channel Communications in July 1999. Clear Channel swapped KKDM's modern rock format and programming with new sister station KCCQ (which had recently moved to a new frequency and increased power) in exchange for that station's CHR format. KKDM was rebranded as "Kiss 1075", then later "1075 KISS FM".

Previous logos

HD Radio subchannels
KKDM operates two HD Radio subchannels on 107.5 - 2 (The Heat) and 107.5 - 3 (K-Love Christian radio) respectively.

References

External links
Kiss 107.5 KKDM official website

KDM
Contemporary hit radio stations in the United States
Radio stations established in 1995
IHeartMedia radio stations
1995 establishments in Iowa